Joey van den Berg (born 13 February 1986) is a Dutch professional footballer who plays as a defensive midfielder. He formerly played professional football for SC Heerenveen, FC Omniworld, Go Ahead Eagles, PEC Zwolle and Reading.

Career

Dutch Club Career
A tough-tackling defensive midfielder, Van den Berg received a record-equaling 7th Eredivisie red card in March 2016.

Reading
On 28 June 2016, it was announced that Reading would sign Van den Berg on a two-year contract after his current deal expired at SC Heerenveen and when the transfer window officially opened on 1 July 2016. He scored his first goal for Reading in a 2–0 EFL Cup win against Plymouth Argyle on 9 August 2016. On 27 September 2017, van den Berg extended his contract with Reading until the summer of 2019.

On 25 July 2018, van den Berg joined NEC in the Dutch Eerste Divisie on a season-long loan deal.

He was released by Reading at the end of the 2018–19 season.

NEC 
After his release by Reading in July 2019, he rejoined his old club, NEC on a two-year contract. However, after only one month, the club's director, Wilco van Schaik, indicated to the veteran, that his salary weighed heavily on the budget and that NEC therefore was prepared to allow Van den Berg to leave transfer-free. that other, younger players will be preferred for the time being. In addition, Van den Berg had to give up his shirt number 8. Van den Berg revealed in the medias, that the coaches suddenly told him, that "you get little playing time this season". On 4 November 2019, his contract was terminated.

Alcides
After three months without a club, van den Berg signed a deal with Dutch amateur club MVV Alcides - the club he also played for in - on 3 February 2020, after failing to find a professional club during the January transfer market.

On 20 September 2020 the club confirmed, that van den Berg suffered from knee problems and probably wouldn't play for the club anymore. However, he would continue to participate in the trainings.

Career statistics

Club

Honours
PEC Zwolle
Eerste Divisie (1): 2011–12

References

External links
 Voetbal International profile 

1986 births
Living people
Dutch footballers
People from Meppel
Association football midfielders
SC Heerenveen players
Almere City FC players
Go Ahead Eagles players
PEC Zwolle players
Reading F.C. players
Eredivisie players
Eerste Divisie players
English Football League players
Dutch expatriate footballers
Expatriate footballers in England
Dutch expatriate sportspeople in England
Footballers from Drenthe